Ronan McNamee (born 31 July 1991) is a Gaelic footballer who plays for the Aghyaran club and the Tyrone county team. He usually lines out at full back.

Honours
Tyrone
 All-Ireland Senior Football Championship (1): 2021
 Ulster Senior Football Championship (3): 2016, 2017, 2021

Individual
 All Star Award (1): 2019

References

Living people
Tyrone inter-county Gaelic footballers
1991 births